Mary Costa (born April 5, 1930) is an American retired actress and singer. Her most notable film credit is providing the voice of Princess Aurora in the 1959 Disney animated film Sleeping Beauty, of which she is the last surviving original voice actress of the first three Disney Princesses created in Walt Disney's lifetime and for which she was named a Disney Legend in 1999. She is a recipient of the 2020 National Medal of Arts.

Early life
Mary Costa was born in Knoxville, Tennessee, where she lived for much of her childhood. Raised as a Baptist of Italian descent, she sang Sunday school solos at the age of six. At Knoxville High School (Tennessee), she sang in the chorus. When she was in her early teens, her family relocated to Los Angeles, California, where she completed high school and won a Music Sorority Award as the outstanding voice among Southern California high school seniors. Following high school, she entered the Los Angeles Conservatory of Music to study with famed maestro Gaston Usigli. Between 1948 and 1951, she appeared with Edgar Bergen and Charlie McCarthy on the Bergen radio show. She also sang with Dean Martin and Jerry Lewis in concerts at UCLA, and made numerous commercials for Lux Radio Theatre.

Career
In 1952, after meeting people at a party with her future husband, director Frank Tashlin, she auditioned for the part of Disney's Princess Aurora, the Sleeping Beauty, in Disney's Sleeping Beauty (1959). Walt Disney called her personally within hours of the audition to inform her that the part was hers. In 1958, Costa was called upon to substitute for Elisabeth Schwarzkopf at a gala concert in the Hollywood Bowl, conducted by Carmen Dragon. Thanks to glowing reviews from that performance, she was invited to sing the lead in her first fully staged operatic production, The Bartered Bride, produced by the renowned German producer, Carl Ebert, for the Los Angeles Guild Opera. Ebert later requested she appear at the Glyndebourne Festival, where she debuted.

Costa went on to perform in 44 operatic roles on stages throughout the world, including Jules Massenet's Manon at the Metropolitan Opera, and Violetta in La traviata at the Royal Opera House in London and the Bolshoi in Moscow, and Cunegonde in the 1959 London premiere of Leonard Bernstein's Candide. In 1961, for RCA, she recorded Musetta in La bohème, opposite Anna Moffo and Richard Tucker, with the Rome Opera House Orchestra and Chorus conducted by Erich Leinsdorf.

Among roles which she sang for the San Francisco Opera, she was Tytania in the American premiere of Britten's A Midsummer Night's Dream (1961), Ninette in the world premiere of Norman Dello Joio's Blood Moon (1961), and Anne Truelove in the San Francisco premiere of Stravinsky's The Rake's Progress. She made her Metropolitan Opera debut as Violetta in La traviata on January 6, 1964.

Costa impressed television audiences throughout her career with guest appearances on many shows, such as Bing Crosby's Christmas Show on NBC-TV. She appeared with Crosby and Sergio Franchi on The Hollywood Palace in 1970. She also appeared on Frank Sinatra's Woman of the Year Timex Special for NBC, where, with others, she was honored as one of the Women of the Year. In 1973, Sammy Davis Jr. asked her to appear on his first NBC Follies, in which she performed a blues selection with Sammy, backed up by Charlie Parker.

Jacqueline Kennedy asked her to sing at a memorial service for her husband, U.S. President John F. Kennedy, from the Los Angeles Sports Arena in 1963. She sang for the inaugural concert of the John F. Kennedy Center for the Performing Arts in 1971. In 1972, she starred in the Metro-Goldwyn-Mayer feature The Great Waltz, depicting the life of Johann Strauss II. Additional movie credits include The Big Caper (1957) and Marry Me Again (1953).

Personal life
Mary married cartoonist and screenwriter Frank Tashlin in 1953. After thirteen years Mary and Frank's marriage ended in divorce in 1966.

Later years
Having retired from acting in 2000,  Costa has dedicated her later years to inspiring children and teenagers, giving motivational talks at schools and colleges across the country. She is also a celebrity endorser for child abuse prevention. She continues to do promotional appearances for Disney, most recently for the Blu-ray release of Sleeping Beauty and the 50th anniversary of the film. 

In 1989, she received the Lifetime Achievement Award of the Licia Albanese Puccini Foundation. When Disney began releasing videocassette versions of its animated films, Costa was one of three actresses to file lawsuits over royalties for their performances; at the time of Costa's 1989 filing, Peggy Lee of Lady and the Tramp (1955) later won her lawsuit in April 1990 and  Ilene Woods of Cinderella (1950) filed hers in December 1990. Voice actress Jennifer Hale replaced Costa as the voice of Aurora in 2001. In November 1999, she received the Disney Legends Award, and her handprints are now a permanent part of the Disney Legends Plaza at the entrance to Disney Studios. In 2000 she was selected as the Tennessee Woman of Distinction by the American Lung Association. And in April 2001, she was honored by the Metropolitan Opera Guild for Distinguished Verdi Performances of the 20th Century. In 2003 she was appointed by President George W. Bush to the National Council on the Arts, where she served until 2007. In December 2007, she was awarded an honorary Doctor of Fine Arts degree by Carson–Newman College in Jefferson City, Tennessee. On November 2, 2007, she was inducted into the Knoxville Opera Hall of Fame. Earlier she had launched the inaugural Knoxville Opera season in 1978 as Violetta in La traviata.

On April 24, 2012, Costa served as the commencement speaker at Pellissippi State graduation ceremony. On November 10, 2014, she was awarded an Honorary Doctorate of Humane and Musical Letters from the College of Arts and Sciences, University of Tennessee, Knoxville. In 2014, Costa was named one of the YWCA Knoxville's Tribute to Women Honorees during the 30th anniversary celebration. On March 17, 2015 she was a recipient of Tennessee's 2015 Governor's Arts Award. On her 86th birthday, Costa wrote an open letter to her fans thanking them for their support. She also announced that she would no longer directly reply to fan-mail, but she would continue to sign autographs and meet fans at events while also focusing her efforts on working with young children. In August 2020 during the COVID-19 pandemic, Costa once again thanked fans for their continued support but also announced that she would no longer respond to any fan-mail at all due to the overwhelming amount she received following her 90th birthday. She was awarded the National Medal of Arts on January 13, 2021.

Filmography

Television

Television shows

Film

Awards and recognition

Notes

Further reading
Cummings, David (ed.), "Costa, Mary, International Who's Who in Classical Music, Routledge, 2003, p. 158; 
Hayes, John "2 with Futures to Follow: Mary Costa and Marilyn Horne", Billboard, May 16, 1964, p. 38
Hollis, Tim and Ehrbar, Greg, Mouse tracks: the story of Walt Disney Records, Univ. Press of Mississippi, 2006, p. 52; 
Kennedy, Michael and Bourne, Joyce, Mary Costa profile, The Concise Oxford Dictionary of Music, Oxford University Press, 1996 (accessed via Encyclopedia.com on January 26, 2010)
Metropolitan Opera, Performance Record: Costa, Mary profile, metoperafamily.org; accessed August 12, 2014.
Sleeman, Elizabeth (ed.), Mary Costa profile, The International Who's Who of Women, Routledge, 2001, p. 116; 
The Walt Disney Company, Disney Legends: Mary Costa m legends.disney.go.com; accessed January 26, 2010.

External links

 
 
 Mary Costa at the Disney Legends Website

1930 births
20th-century American actresses
Living people
American film actresses
American operatic sopranos
American voice actresses
American people of Italian descent
Glendale High School (Glendale, California) alumni
Musicians from Knoxville, Tennessee
21st-century American women singers
Baptists from Tennessee
Tennessee Democrats
21st-century American singers
California Democrats
United States National Medal of Arts recipients
21st-century American women opera singers
20th-century American women singers
American stage actresses
20th-century American singers
American radio actresses
21st-century American actresses
American musical theatre actresses